Costanza is a feminine given name and a surname. It may refer to:

People

Given name
Costanza d'Avalos, Duchess of Francavilla (1460–1541)
Costanza Bonaccorsi (born 1994), Italian canoeist
Costanza Chiaramonte (1377–1423), Neapolitan noble
Costanza Di Camillo (born 1995), Italian synchronized swimmer
Costanza Farnese (1500–1545), daughter of Pope Paul III
Costanza Fiorentini (born 1984), Italian synchronized swimmer
Costanza Ferro (born 1993), Italian synchronized swimmer
Costanza Ghilini (1754–1775), Italian painter
Costanza Sforza, Duchess of Sora (1550–1617)
Costanza Starace (1845–1921), Italian nun
Costanza Varano (1426–1447), Italian humanist
Costanza Zanoletti (born 1980), Italian skeleton racer

Surname
Chrissy Costanza (born 1995), American singer
John Costanza (born 1943), American artist and letterer
Midge Costanza (1932–2010), American politician
Mike Costanza, American filmmaker
Pascal Costanza, German computer scientist
Pete Costanza (1913–1984), American comic book artist and illustrator
Robert Costanza (born 1950), American-Australian ecologist and economist
Tomas Costanza (born 1976), American record producer
Tony Costanza (1968–2020), American drummer
Valentina Costanza (born 1987), Italian runner

Fictional characters
In the American sitcom Seinfeld:
 Estelle Costanza, mother of George Costanza 
 Frank Costanza, father of George Costanza
 George Costanza, one of the main characters
 the title character of Costanza / Costanzo, an Italian literary fairy tale

See also
 Santa Costanza, a church in Rome
 Constance (name)
 Constanza (disambiguation)
 Costanzo (disambiguation)

Italian feminine given names
Italian-language surnames